The 1892 Rutgers Queensmen football team represented Rutgers University as an independent during the 1892 college football season. The Queensmen compiled a 3–5–1 record and were outscored by their opponents, 160 to 108. The team had no coach, and its captain was John C. Loud.

Schedule

References

Rutgers
Rutgers Scarlet Knights football seasons
Rutgers Queensmen football